Folarin Jerry Balogun (born 3 July 2001) is a professional footballer who plays as a striker for Ligue 1 club Reims, on loan from  club Arsenal. Born in the United States, he represents England at youth international level.

Early life
Balogun was born in New York City and emigrated to England when he was two years old, growing up in London. His parents were born in Nigeria. Balogun is often referred to by his nickname of 'Flo', coined for him in his years at Arsenal's Hale End academy.

Club career

Arsenal

Early career
Balogun joined Arsenal at the age of eight after being scouted while playing for his previous Sunday League side, Aldersbrook. Before trialling with Arsenal, he had trialled with North London rivals Tottenham Hotspur and nearly signed for them.

In 2017 he was an integral part of Trevor Bumstead's Arsenal U16 side that won the Liam Brady Cup, beating Bayern Munich, Manchester United and Juventus respectively.

He signed a professional contract in February 2019.

In July 2020, after failing to agree a new contract with Arsenal, he was linked with a transfer away from the club, including a proposed £8 million sale to Brentford.

He made his senior debut in the Europa League on 29 October 2020, coming on as a substitute in the 74th minute in a group stage match against Dundalk.

He scored his first senior goal on 26 November 2020, in a Europa League group stage match against Molde.

On 26 April 2021, Balogun signed a new long-term contract with the club.

Balogun made his Premier League debut in a 2–0 loss against newly promoted Brentford on 13 August 2021.

On 12 January 2022, he joined EFL Championship club Middlesbrough on a loan deal until the end of the season.

2022–23 season: Loan to Reims
In August 2022, he moved on loan to French club Reims. Balogun scored on his debut for the club on 7 August, a 4–1 defeat to Marseille; fellow Arsenal loanee Nuno Tavares scored for Marseille in the match, on his debut respectively. On 29 January 2023, Balogun scored a late goal in stoppage time to seal a 1–1 draw away to league leaders PSG. It was his 11th goal in Ligue 1 during the season, the most of any player aged 21 or under in Europe's top five leagues. Three days later, Balogun scored his first senior hat-trick in a 4–2 win over Lorient, his 14th goal of the season in Ligue 1. This made him the top scorer in Ligue 1.

International career
Born in the United States to Nigerian parents and raised in England, Balogun is eligible to represent all three nations at international level. After playing for England at the under-17 level and appearing in the 2018 UEFA European Under-17 Championship, he accepted a call up from the United States under-18 national team in August 2018 for a training camp and a tournament in the Czech Republic. He played in all four of the United States' games in the Václav Ježek Youth Tournament and scored twice. He has also expressed interest in playing for Nigeria, although he has stated that he enjoys England's "style of play" which is "similar to Arsenal's".

In 2019, he appeared and scored for the England under-18 national team in a tournament in Dubai. In October 2020 he made an appearance for the England under-20 against Wales.

On 27 August 2021, Balogun received his first call up to the England under-21 team. On 7 September 2021, he made his England U21 debut as a substitute during the 2–0 2023 UEFA European Under-21 Championship qualification win over Kosovo under-21s at Stadium MK.

In October 2022 he said he was open to playing for Nigeria.

Style of play
Balogun is known for his pace, technique, and being two-footed. Martin Keown has compared Balogun to Arsenal's second highest ever goalscorer Ian Wright, due to his pace and intelligent movement. In his first interview for Middlesbrough, Balogun said he takes inspiration from Edinson Cavani and Robert Lewandowski.

Media
Balogun was involved in the Amazon Original sports docuseries All or Nothing: Arsenal, which documented the club by spending time with the coaching staff and players behind the scenes both on and off the field throughout their 2021–22 season.

Career statistics

References

External links
 Profile at the Arsenal F.C. website
 Profile at the Premier League website
 

2001 births
Living people
Soccer players from New York City
English footballers
England youth international footballers
American soccer players
United States men's youth international soccer players
English sportspeople of Nigerian descent
American sportspeople of Nigerian descent
American emigrants to England
Arsenal F.C. players
Middlesbrough F.C. players
Association football forwards
Footballers from Greater London
Black British sportspeople
Premier League players
England under-21 international footballers
Stade de Reims players
English expatriate footballers
English expatriate sportspeople in France
Expatriate footballers in France
Ligue 1 players